Vanard is a community on the island of Saint Lucia; it is located towards the heart of the island, near Sarot.  The region of Vanard is in both Anse la Ray and Castries Districts.

See also
List of cities in Saint Lucia
Casteries District

References

Towns in Saint Lucia